Daniel Bernard Sweeney (born November 14, 1961) is an American actor known for his roles as Jackie Willow, in Francis Ford Coppola's Gardens of Stone (1987), Lt. Phil Lowenthal in Memphis Belle (1990), and Travis Walton in Fire in the Sky (1993). He also star in these films such as The Cutting Edge (1992), Shoeless Joe Jackson in Eight Men Out (1988), Lonesome Dove (1989), and Dinosaur (2000).

He has guest-starred on various television series, including House (2006), Jericho (2006–2008), Castle (2011). He played FBI Special Agent Morris on The Closer and Major Crimes. He also had recurring roles such as Criminal Minds (2009), Crash (2008), The Event (2010).

Early life
Sweeney was born in Shoreham, New York, on November 14, 1961. He attended both Tulane and New York University.

Career
In 1990, Sweeney starred as Treplev in Jeff Cohen's contemporary adaptation of Anton Chekhov's classic The Seagull at a tiny Off Off-Broadway theater (the RAPP Arts Center) in New York's Alphabet City neighborhood. His co-star was a then unknown Laura Linney, making her New York stage debut as Nina. The New York Times called Sweeney's performance "bold and exciting".

Sweeney guest-starred in the television series The Edge of Night and Spenser: For Hire. In films, he has played Jackie Willow, a Vietnam-era soldier, in Francis Ford Coppola's Gardens of Stone (1987), navigator 1st Lt. Phil Lowenthal in Memphis Belle (1990), and Travis Walton in Fire in the Sky (1993). He also played former ice hockey player Doug Dorsey in The Cutting Edge (1992), Shoeless Joe Jackson in Eight Men Out (1988), and Dish Boggett in Lonesome Dove (1989).

He was a regular cast member on C-16 from 1997 to 1998.

After voicing Aladar the Iguanodon in the 2000 Disney computer animated film Dinosaur, Sweeney played Michael Whitman in Life as We Know It.

Sweeney has guest-starred on various television series, including House (2006) as Crandall, an ex-bandmate of Dr. Gregory House; Jericho as John Goetz, employee of a private military contractor (2006–2008); Castle as a Los Angeles detective (2011), and more. He played FBI Special Agent Morris on The Closer and Major Crimes. He also had recurring roles as U.S. Marshal Sam Kassmeyer, assigned to protect Haley and Jack Hotchner on Criminal Minds (2009); as Peter Emory in season 1 of Crash (2008); and as Carter in The Event (2010).

He is currently the voice-over artist for the OWN: Oprah Winfrey Network, and his large body of voiceover work includes three seasons of Fox Sports Net's Beyond the Glory and National Geographic Television's Ice Pilots. Past ad campaigns include Bud Light, Lincoln cars, Conoco-Phillips, John Deere, Major League Baseball, and Coca-Cola.

Sweeney plays Captain John Trent in the horror web series Universal Dead. In late June 2010, it was announced that Universal Dead will be made into a feature film.

In 2012, Sweeney voiced the adult Avatar Aang in the first and second seasons of The Legend of Korra, the sequel series of Avatar: The Last Airbender. He currently narrates the reality television series Mountain Men.

In 2017, Sweeney plays a pastor in The Resurrection of Gavin Stone

Personal life
In April 2000, Sweeney married Ashley Vachon; they have a son, Cade, and a daughter, Cody.

Filmography

Film

Television

References

External links

 
 
 
 PopGurls 20 Questions with D.B. Sweeney

1961 births
20th-century American male actors
21st-century American male actors
American male film actors
American male stage actors
American male television actors
American male voice actors
Circle in the Square Theatre School alumni
Living people
Male actors from New York (state)
New York University alumni
People from Long Island
People from Shoreham, New York
Tulane University alumni